Kryry is a town in Louny District in the Ústí nad Labem Region of the Czech Republic. It has about 2,400 inhabitants.

Administrative parts
Villages of Běsno, Stebno and Strojetice are administrative parts of Kryry. Stebno forms an exclave of the municipal territory.

Etymology
The name is derived from a Polish word for "scream, shout, caw".

Geography
It lies in the Rakovník Uplands. The Blšanka River flows through the town.

History
The first written mention of Kryry is from 1320. During the Hussite Wars in 1421, the Czech population was murdered by crusaders, and the village became ethnically German. The Germans were expelled after the World War II.

Sights
The most significant monument is the Church of the Nativity of the Virgin Mary. It was built around 1324, and in 1722 it was rebuilt in the Baroque style.

The Schiller Observation Tower was built on a hill above the town in 1905–1906. It was named after the writer Friedrich Schiller, on the centenary of his death.

Notable people
Günther Landgraf (1928–2006), German physicist

References

External links

Cities and towns in the Czech Republic
Populated places in Louny District